The 2015 FIA European Touring Car Cup is the eleventh running of the FIA European Touring Car Cup. It will consist of six events in Hungary, Slovakia, France, Czech Republic, Belgium and Italy. The championship will be split into three categories: Super 2000 for TC2 Turbo and TC2 machinery, Super 1600, and the Single-Make Trophy for cars such as the SEAT León Supercopa.

Nikolay Karamyshev, Petr Fulín, Gilles Bruckner and Dmitry Bragin will be the defending champions in TC2 Turbo, TC2, Super 1600 and Single-makes Trophy respectively. From these four only Bruckner will be able to defend his title as Fulín moved to the Single-makes Trophy, while Karamyshev and Bragin left the series.

Teams and drivers

Race calendar and results

Championship standings

† — Drivers did not finish the race, but were classified as they completed over 75% of the race distance.

References

External links

European Touring Car Cup
European Touring Car Cup
Touring Car Cup